Henry Ludlow may refer to:
Henry Ludlow (died 1639) (1577–1639), English MP
Henry Ludlow (died 1643) (1592–1643), English MP
Henry G. Ludlow (1797–1867), American minister and abolitionist

See also